Clathrus archeri (synonyms Lysurus archeri, Anthurus archeri, Pseudocolus archeri), commonly known as octopus stinkhorn or devil's fingers, is a fungus which has a global distribution. Using rDNA, Geastrales, Gauteriales and Phallales form a monophyletic group and eventually differentiation of Nidulariales and Tulostomatales within the euagarics clade. This species was first described in 1980 in a collection from Tasmania. The young fungus erupts from a suberumpent egg by forming into four to seven elongated slender arms initially erect and attached at the top. The arms then unfold to reveal a pinkish-red interior covered with a dark-olive spore-containing gleba. In maturity it smells like putrid flesh. Recently, C. archeri var. alba with white tentacles or arms has been reported from the Shola Forests in the Western Ghats, Kerala, India.

Morphology 
Clathrus archeri grows in 2 distinct stages, first an egg stage followed by the fungal "arms" emerging. During the egg stage, Clathrus archeri forms a white ball-like egg shape, usually 2–3 cm in diameter. Next, the thallus emerges from the egg in a starfish-like shape with 4-6 arms on average (up to 8). Each arm can grow up to 10 cm in length and is coated in gleba on the upper surface. Fruiting bodies produce a red-orange color due to the production of carotenoids.  Fungal spores are oblong, smooth, and 3.5-6 x 1.5-2 µm in size. It is hypothesized that the strong putrid smell of the gleba support evidence of coevolution with some angiosperm flowers called sapromyiophilous flowers.

In a laboratory setting, Clathrus archeri was found to grow best in 26℃ on a compost agar (CA) medium with a pH of 6.0. Under these conditions, the thallus grew an average of 2.9mm a day over 4 weeks and in a radial shape. Clathrus archeri produces white and fluffy mycelium and eventually turns a pink color. Mycelia strands are 0.5 to 1.5mm in diameter and branch in a tree-like manner. Fungal Hyphae create irregularly shaped vesicles that contain lipids. On the surface of the hyphae, calcium oxalate crystals are secreted. It is hypothesized that this outer layer of crystals creates a protective hydrophobic layer around the hyphae. Clathrus archeri forms unstable perforate septal pore caps, this may suggest that perforation formation in Phallomycetidae begins later in comparison to similar groups.

Ecology 
Clathrus archeri grows best in environments rich in decaying vegetation. The fungus is a saprotroph. It is most commonly found in leaf litter or mulch below vegetation. The most abundant acid secreted by the fungus is oxalic acid, this acid binds to metal cations and increases the bioavailability of some minerals. Fungal mycelium exhibits calcium pooling which changes soil pH and availability of phosphorus for surrounding flora.

Habitat 
Common in environments with abundant decaying organic matter. Clathrus archeri is most commonly found in leaf litter, mulch, woodlands, and grasslands. Saprophytes prefer areas with high moisture or water, access to oxygen, neutral pH, and low-medium temperatures.

Geographic distribution 
The species is believed to be endemic to southern Africa, New Zealand and Australia, but has been spreading to other continents and is often invasive. Clathrus archeri now has a global distribution and has been naturalised in Europe and North America. It was first discovered in the UK over a century ago (~1914) and has spread across much of Europe. Clathrus archeri was likely introduced via wool fabric in supplies for WWI. As climate changes drive niche habitat lost, Clathrus archeri is expected to become threatened in Australia but is expected to expand to northeast Europe. The expansion of Clathrus archeri in Europe is further supported by its invasion into 2 new Romanian sites in July 2013. Furthermore, Clathrus archeri has been found in 90 sites in Poland as of 2013, 65% of which are located in forests. Recent modeling studies in Poland expect the alien species to occur in areas with a thick layer of snow, which does not melt in winter, at higher altitudes, where the water deficit is low.

Unique characteristics 
Clathrus archeri produces compounds similar to the scent of rotting flesh. This compound production supports evidence of convergent evolution between fungi and angiosperms. This scent is used by the fungus to attract flies to serve as agents for spore dispersal. Clathrus archeri is not known to be toxic, however, consuming this fungus would not be enjoyable. Due to the rotting stench of stinkhorns, culinary application is not a common thought. There is also no record of the fungus being treated as a delicacy.

References

Phallales
Fungi described in 1859
Fungi native to Australia
Fungi of New Zealand
Fungi of Asia
Fungi of Europe
Fungi of North America
Taxa named by Miles Joseph Berkeley